This is a list of notable Islamic shrines in Tamil Nadu, a state of India.

 Trichy Darga - Thable Aalam Basha aka Nathar Shah Walliyullah 
 Tanjore Darga - Kalifa e Thable Aalam Basha aka Nathar Shah Walliyullah 
 Erwadi Dargah -Qutbus Sultan Syed Ibrahim shaheed Badusha
 Kattupalli -A compound of dargahs - Ervadi.
 Nagore Dargah -Abdul Qadir Shahul Hameed Qadir Badusha Wali
 Pallapatti - Sheik Abdul Kadhar Avliya- Pallapatti
 Goripalayam Darga - Goripalayam Darga
 Hazrat Noor Mohammad Shah Dargah - Podakkudi and Panruti Darga
 Kovalam Darga - Kovalam Darga, Chennai
 Kunangudi Masthan Sahib - Kuangudi Mastan Sahib Darga, Thondiarpet
 Muthupet dargha, Sheik Dawood Kamlil Valyullah Dargah
 Syek Appa Shek Amma Oliyulla Dargah, Maavoor, Thondi Road, Ramanathapuram District
 Sheikh Sadaqathullahil Khahiri Dargah, Keelakarai
 Sheikh Umarul Khahiri Valiyyullah Dargah, Kayal Pattanam
 Sheikh Keelakarai Thaika Swahib and Imamul Aroos Mappilai Labbai Alim Dargah, Meletheru, Keelakarai
Lalpet Dargah of 20h Century Sufi Saint Sheikh Shams-ul-Aarifeen Qutb-ul-Aqtab Khwaja Dil Nawaz FaizeeShah Noori Chisti-ul-Qadiri whose Mausoleum (or tomb) is at Lalpet Dargah, Cuddalore District of Tamil Nadu, India.

 
Dargahs
Lists of religious buildings and structures in India